Summertime Shootout 3: Coldest Summer Ever is the seventh studio album by American rapper Fabolous, released on November 29, 2019, by Street Family Records, Roc Nation and Def Jam Recordings. The album includes guest appearances from 2 Chainz, A Boogie wit da Hoodie, Chris Brown, Davido, Gucci Mane, Jacquees, Jeremih, Josh K, Lil Durk, Meek Mill, PnB Rock, Roddy Ricch, Teyana Taylor, Tory Lanez, Ty Dolla Sign and YFN Lucci. The album also serves as the third and final installment of the Summertime Shootout series.

Background
In August 2017, Fabolous announced the project via his Instagram using the hashtag "#SummertimeShootout3OnTheWay". On July 8, 2018, the first single "Ooh Yea" featuring Ty Dolla $ign was released. On October 14, 2019, the second single "Choosy" featuring Jeremih and Davido was released. On November 15, 2019, the third single "B.O.M.B.S." was released. On March 27, 2020, the music video for "Cold Summer" was released and directed by Diego Cruz. In early April 2020, Fabolous started the #ColdSummerChallenge on Instagram during the COVID-19 pandemic lockdown, allowing fans and other artists to share their creativity by performing a freestyle over the instrumental using the hashtag.

Release
Ten days before the release of the album, Fabolous posted a 30-second trailer for the album on his Instagram along with its release date. A week later the tracklist and the cover art for the album was revealed.

Commercial performance
Summertime Shootout 3: Coldest Summer Ever debuted at number seven on the US Billboard 200 chart, earning 44,000 album-equivalent units, of which 6,000 were pure album sales in its first week, becoming Fabolous's seventh US top ten on the chart.

Track listing

Notes
  signifies an uncredited co-producer

Sample credits

 "B.O.M.B.S." contains a sample from "Sirius", written by Alan Parsons and Eric Woolfson, as performed by The Alan Parsons Project.
 "Gone for the Summer" contains a sample from "Mixed Up Moods and Attitudes", performed by The Fantastic Four.
 "Seasons Change" contains a sample from "Summertime", performed by DJ Jazzy Jeff & The Fresh Prince.
 "My Mind" contains a sample from "Missing You", performed by Case.
 "Options" contains a sample from "Love Is Missing From Our Lives", performed by The Dells and The Dramatics.
 "Insecure" contains an interpolation from "Song Cry", written by Jay Z, and a sample from "I Luv Your Girl" performed by The-Dream.
 "Frenemies" contains an interpolation from "Friends", performed by Whodini, and a sample from "The Vibes is Right", as performed by Barrington Levy.
 "Us vs. The World" contains both a sample and an interpolation from "Some Cut", performed by Trillville.

Charts

Weekly charts

Year-end charts

References

Fabolous albums
2019 albums
Def Jam Recordings albums
Albums produced by AraabMuzik
Albums produced by Bink (record producer)
Albums produced by Cubeatz
Albums produced by DJ Khalil
Albums produced by TM88
Sequel albums